Kaljurand is an Estonian surname meaning "Cliff Beach".

Notable people bearing this name include:

Ailar Kaljurand (Gabriel Eisel; born 1985), blogger (et)
Ain Kaljurand (born 1965), businessman (et)
Ants Kaljurand (Ants the Terrible; 1917–1951), partisan (Forest Brother)
Anu Kaljurand (born 1969), hurdler
Kaire Kaljurand (born 1974), footballer
Kalle Kaljurand (born 1960), badminton player
Kristjan Kaljurand (born 1992), badminton player
Marina Kaljurand (born 1962), diplomat

Estonian-language surnames